The brown barbet (Caloramphus fuliginosus) is a species of bird in the family Megalaimidae. It is found in Borneo. Its natural habitat is subtropical or tropical moist lowland forests.

The sooty barbet was considered conspecific.

References

Caloramphus
Endemic birds of Borneo
Birds described in 1830
Taxonomy articles created by Polbot